Walter Schuur (born 14 December 1910; date of death unknown) was a German canoeist, born in Hamburg, who competed in the 1936 Summer Olympics. In 1936 he finished fourth together with his partner Christian Holzenberg in the C-2 10000 metre event.

References
Walter Schuur's profile at Sports Reference.com

1910 births
Sportspeople from Hamburg
Canoeists at the 1936 Summer Olympics
German male canoeists
Olympic canoeists of Germany
Year of death missing